Nizhny Baskunchak is an urban-type settlement in Akhtubinsky District of Astrakhan Oblast, Russia. Population: 

The settlement is located on the western shore of Lake Baskunchak.

References

Notes

Sources

Urban-type settlements in Astrakhan Oblast